The Co-ordinating Council of South African Trade Unions (CCSATU) was a national trade union federation of white workers in South Africa.

The South African Trades and Labour Council (SAT&LC) included all unions, but a minority of its affiliates opposed the affiliates of unions of black workers.  Five unions of white workers resigned from the SAT&LC in 1947, and in 1948 they founded the Co-ordinating Council of South African Trade Unions.  It was supportive of apartheid, and its development was encouraged by the National Party.

In 1957, the federation affiliated to the South African Confederation of Labour (SACOL).  By 1962, it had 13 affiliates, with a total of 40,221 members.  As SACOL became more centralised, CCSATU declined in importance, and it appears to have dissolved around 1980.

References

Apartheid in South Africa
National trade union centres of South Africa
Trade unions established in 1948